The least poorwill  or least pauraque (Siphonorhis brewsteri) is a species of nightjar in the family Caprimulgidae, and the only confirmed extant species of its genus. It is endemic to the island of Hispaniola, which is shared by the Dominican Republic and Haiti.

Taxonomy and systematics

The least poorwill was previously considered conspecific with the Jamaican poorwill (Siphonorhis americana), which is now believed to be extinct. It has two subspecies, the nominate S. b. brewsteri and S. b. gonavensis.

Description

The nominate subspecies' upperparts are grayish brown with blackish streaks and the folded wing shows bold white spots. It has a wide buff collar on the hindneck. The breast is dark brown with white spots and the belly white with brown bars and vermiculation. All but the central tail feathers have narrow pale tips, white in the male and buff in the female. S. b. gonavensis is thought to be smaller and paler overall.

Distribution and habitat

The nominate subspecies of least poorwill is found in the central and western parts of the Dominican Republic, especially Pedernales, Independencia, and Barahona Provinces, and adjoining Ouest Department in Haiti. S. b. gonavensis is found only on Haiti's Ile de la Gonâve. The species is thought to be generally rare, although it can be locally common, and is possibly under-reported. Recorded sightings are most common in the Dominican Republic, with very few in Haiti.

The least poorwill inhabits arid to semi-arid landscapes such as limestone woodland and areas of cactus and thorn scrub. It also occurs in deciduous, coniferous, and mixed forest.

Behavior

Feeding

Little is known about the least poorwill's feeding behavior and diet, though the latter is believed to be insects.

Breeding

The least poorwill is believed to breed between April and June. One clutch of two eggs was laid directly on the ground with no nest.

Vocalization

The male least poorwill's song is "a whistled 'toorrrrri' rising in pitch, or a warbled 'tworrri'." The species also makes "short, whistled 'toorric' or 'to-ic'" calls and "dove-like scratchy sounds".

Status

The IUCN originally assessed the least poorwill in 1988 as Near Threatened and changed the rating to Data Deficient in 2000. Since 2007 it has again been assessed as Near Threatened. Its population is estimated at fewer than 15,000 mature individuals and is decreasing. The primary threats are habitat destruction and predation by introduced mongooses and rats.

References

least poorwill
Endemic birds of Hispaniola
Endemic birds of the Caribbean
Birds of the Dominican Republic
Birds of Haiti
least poorwill
least poorwill
Taxonomy articles created by Polbot